The Cornwall Wildlife Trust is a charitable organisation founded in 1962 that is concerned solely with Cornwall, England.

Cornwall Wildlife Trust is part of The Wildlife Trusts partnership of 46 wildlife trusts in the United Kingdom. It works in conjunction with the Isles of Scilly Wildlife Trust on some matters. Cornwall Wildlife Trust produces a thrice-yearly magazine called Wild Cornwall.

The direction and work that the Trust currently does is guided by the Cornwall Biodiversity action plan. Living Seas and Living Landscapes are two such projects. The Trust  runs ERCCIS (Environmental Records Centre for Cornwall and the Isles of Scilly), a county wide database of sightings of animals and plants, and records of geology. It also gives planning advice (CEC - Cornwall Environmental Consultants) to land developers.

The Trust is based at Allet near Truro in Cornwall. The headquarters and offices are adjacent to the Trust's Five Acres nature reserve. This reserve includes two ponds, as well as mixed broadleaved and conifer woodland.

List of reserves

1. Armstrong Wood
2. Baker's Pit
3. Beales Meadows
4. Bissoe Valley
5. Bosvenning Common
6. Cabilla and Redrice Woods
7. Caer Brân
8. Carn Moor
9. Chûn Downs
10. Churchtown Farm, near Saltash
11. Chyverton
12. Devichoys Wood, near Penryn
13. Downhill Meadow
14. River Fal—River Ruan Estuary
15. Five Acres, at the Cornwall Wildlife Trust Headquarters, Allet, near Truro
16. Fox Corner, south of Truro
17. Greena Moor
18. Halbullock Moor, south of Truro 	
19. Hawkes Wood
20. Helman Tor (including Breney Common and Red Moor, near Lostwithiel 
21. Kemyel Crease
22. Kennall Vale, at Ponsanooth, between Falmouth & Redruth
23. Lanvean Bottoms
24. Loggan's Moor, near Hayle
25. Loveny/Colliford Reservoir
26. Lower Lewdon
27. Luckett/Greenscombe Wood

28. Maer Lake
29. Nansmellyn Marsh
30. North Predannack Downs
31. Park Hoskyn - The Hayman Reserve
32. Pendarves Wood, near Camborne
33. Penlee Battery, near Kingsand
34. Phillips's Point
35. Priddacombe Downs
36. Prideaux Wood
37. Quoit Heathland
38. Redlake Cottage Meadows
39. Ropehaven Cliffs
40. Rosenannon Downs
41. St Erth Pits, at St. Erth
42. St George's Island (or Looe Island), near Looe
43. Swanvale, Falmouth
44. Sylvia's Meadow, near Callington
45. Tamar Estuary, near Saltash
46. Tincombe, near Saltash
47. Trebarwith, near Tintagel
48. Tregonetha Downs, near Goss Moor
49. Tresayes Quarry, near Roche
50. Tywardreath Marsh, near Par
51. Upton Meadow, near Bude
52. Upton Towans, near Hayle
53. Ventongimps Moor, near Zelah, Cornwall
54. Marsland Valley, north of Bude
55. Windmill Farm, on The Lizard

See also

 Stella Turk

External links

 
 

1962 establishments in England
Environment of Cornwall
Nature reserves in Cornwall
 
Wildlife
Wildlife Trusts of England